Neeraj Nayar is the sitting Member of the Legislative Assembly from the Chamba Assembly constituency in the Himachal Pradesh Legislative Assembly. He won the election in 2022 Himachal Pradesh Legislative Assembly election. Nayar is a cabinet minister of Himachal Pradesh.

Nayar won the election, defeating BJP candidate Neelam Nayyar.

References 

Living people
Indian politicians
Himachal Pradesh MLAs 2022–2027
Year of birth missing (living people)